Georges Grey, born Georges-Jean-Joseph Gacon (1911–1954) was a French actor. In 1948 he starred in the film The Lame Devil under Sacha Guitry.

Biography

He studied engineering at university, before going to the Cavalry School of Saumur. He then went to Paris to begin a career as an actor, where he was noticed by Sacha Guitry who began giving him roles in his films. He toured with Marcel Pagnol and Gilles Grangier later on in life.

He died of tuberculosis in a sanatorium on April 2, 1954, in Passy.

Filmography

Film 
 1937: Cinderella, Pierre Caron
 1937: The Pearls of the Crown, Sacha Guitry and Christian-Jaque
 1937: Quadrille, Sacha Guitry
 1938: Remontons les Champs-Élysées, Sacha Guitry
 1938: Nine Bachelors, Sacha Guitry
 1940: Narcisse, Ayres d'Aguiar
 1940: Monsieur Hector, Maurice Cammage
 1940: Chambre 13, André Hugon
 1940: Hangman's Noose, Léon Mathot
 1940: The Well-Digger's Daughter, Marcel Pagnol
 1941: Cartacalha, reine des gitans, Léon Mathot
 1941: Le Valet maître, Paul Mesnier
 1941: Le Destin fabuleux de Désirée Clary, Sacha Guitry
 1942: La Duchesse de Langeais, Jacques de Baroncelli
 1942: The Blue Veil, Jean Stelli
 1942: Huit Hommes dans un château, Richard Pottier
 1942: Patricia, Paul Mesnier
 1943: Adémaï bandit d'honneur, Gilles Grangier
 1945: Monsieur Grégoire s'évade, Jacques Daniel-Norman
 1947: Plume la poule, Walter Kapps
 1947: Third at Heart, Jacques de Casembroot
 1947: Le Comédien, Sacha Guitry
 1948: The Lame Devil, Sacha Guitry
 1948: The Farm of Seven Sins, Jean Devaivre
 1948: Le Colonel Durand, René Chanas

Theatre 
 1937: Quadrille, Sacha Guitry (Théâtre de la Madeleine)
 1948: Le Diable boiteux (theatre adaptation), Sacha Guitry (Théâtre Édouard VII)
 1949: Quadrille, Sacha Guitry (Théâtre des Célestins)

External links

1911 births
1954 deaths
French male film actors
20th-century French male actors